The Tanama is a river in northern Siberia, Russia. It is one of the main tributaries of the Yenisey.

The river has the highest water level in July and the lowest during the winter. It flows through desolate, uninhabited areas and there are no permanent settlements along its course.

Course
The Tanama has its source in the Gyda Peninsula, Yamalo-Nenets Autonomous Okrug, Tyumen Oblast. It flows first roughly northwestwards and northwards, forming a wide arch across the tundra above the Arctic Circle. The Tanama changes direction in its lower course and meanders roughly eastwards, flowing across the swampy lowlands of the northeastern part of the West Siberian Plain. The river freezes in mid-September and stays frozen until late May or early June.

See also
List of rivers of Russia

References

External links
Fishing in Russia
Rivers of Krasnoyarsk Krai
Rivers of Yamalo-Nenets Autonomous Okrug
Rivers of Tyumen Oblast